Colonel Tom may refer to:

 Colonel Tom Parker
 Tom Moore (fundraiser), an Honorary Colonel